David Miner may refer to:

David M. Miner (born 1962), American politician, member of the North Carolina General Assembly, 1993–2004
David Miner (musician) (born 1945), American guitarist, singer and songwriter
David Miner (television producer) (born 1969), American film and television producer
David Manly Miner (born 1941), politician in Saskatchewan, Canada

See also
Dave Minor (1922–1998), American basketball player